Fred Thaddeus Austin (December 28, 1866 – February 26, 1938) was an American military officer who attained the rank of major general as the United States Army's Chief of Field Artillery.

Early life 
Austin was born in Hancock, Vermont, the son of Julius Tilden Austin and Manora (Keith) Austin.  He graduated from high school in Rochester, Vermont, and then attended Norwich University.  He graduated with a Bachelor of Science degree in 1888, and a Master of Science in 1894.  In 1896, Austin received his qualification as a civil engineer.

Early career
Austin served in the 1st Regiment of the Vermont National Guard from 1888 to 1894; a musician, he advanced from private to sergeant to drum major before moving to Massachusetts.

Austin practiced architecture in Brockton and Boston, Massachusetts, from 1889 to 1898.  From 1894 to 1898 he served in the 5th Regiment of the Massachusetts National Guard, first as a drum major, and later as the regimental sergeant major.

Spanish–American War
He volunteered to serve in the United States Army for the Spanish–American War.  When the 5th Massachusetts was activated for federal service, Austin was commissioned as a first lieutenant and appointed as regimental adjutant.  He joined the regular Army after the war; appointed a first lieutenant in the 46th United States Volunteer Infantry on August 17, 1899, he transferred to the Artillery Corps on August 22, 1901. He served in the Artillery Corps for the rest of his career.

Continued career

Austin served primarily in the 3rd Field Artillery, and commanded Battery C from 1909 to 1910, and Battery E from 1910 to 1911.

World War I
During World War I, Austin commanded the 346th Field Artillery Regiment, 350th Field Artillery Regiment, 156th Field Artillery Brigade, 167th Field Artillery Brigade, and the Field Artillery Replacement Depot at Camp Zachary Taylor, Kentucky.  On April 18, 1918, he was promoted to temporary brigadier general, and he received the Army Distinguished Service Medal to recognize his superior wartime service. The citation for the medal reads:

After World War I, Austin became the director of the Field Artillery School at Fort Sill, in Oklahoma, after which he served in the Inspector General's Department. Austin became a major general in 1927, and succeeded William J. Snow as Chief of Field Artillery. He served as Chief from December 20, 1927, to February 15, 1930.

Death and burial
Austin died in Washington, D.C., on February 26, 1938, and was buried in Arlington National Cemetery.

Family
In 1909, Austin married Lenore Harrison of San Antonio. They were the parents of a son, Gordon Harrison Austin (1913–2010), a career officer in the United States Air Force who was a veteran of World War II and attained the rank of major general.

References

Sources

 
 Davis, Henry Blaine. Generals in Khaki. Raleigh, NC: Pentland Press, 1998.  
 Marquis Who's Who, Inc. Who Was Who in American History, the Military. Chicago: Marquis Who's Who, 1975.  

1866 births
1938 deaths
People from Hancock, Vermont
Norwich University alumni
United States Army generals
Recipients of the Distinguished Service Medal (US Army)
Burials at Arlington National Cemetery
United States Army generals of World War I
Military personnel from Vermont